England's UEFA Women's Championship Record includes reaching the UEFA Women's Championship final thrice, in 1984, 2009 and 2022, winning the latter tournament on home soil. England women have also been losing semi-finalists on three occasions, and got knocked out in the finals group stage three times. On four occasions, including the 1989 to 1991 finals inclusive, England have failed to qualify for the final tournament.

About the competition 

In 1984 there was no finals tournament. Instead, the competition took place as follows:  UEFA divided all entrant countries into four groups. Four group winners were determined on a points basis after all teams played each other both home and away. Two points were awarded for a win throughout this period. The four group winners were paired off and played each other as a knockout competition on a two-legged home & away basis. The final was two-legged.

From 1987 there has been a finals tournament and a single host nation, always chosen from the eventual qualifiers. From 1987 until 1993 there were four teams in the finals, increased to eight in 1997, then expanded again to 12 for 2009. In 1995 the competition proceeded on a two-legged home & away basis until a one-off final.

Note: All tournaments have been two-year campaigns.  The year represents the year in which the finals actually took place.

Statistics correct as of 31 December 2009

1984 – Reached Final 

 won.

1987 in Norway – Reached Semi Final 

 won.

1989 in West Germany – Did not qualify

 won.

1991 in Denmark – Did not qualify

 won.

1993 in Italy – Did not qualify

1995 – Reached Semi Final

 won.

1997 in Norway and Sweden – Did not qualify

 won.

2001 in Germany – Reached Finals Group Stage

 won.

Qualification Playoff

Ukraine 1–2 England
England 2–0 Ukraine
England win 4–1 on aggregate and qualify for the Final Tournament

2005 in England – Reached Finals Group Stage

 won.

England qualify for the Final Tournament as hosts

2009 in Finland – Reached Final

 won.

Euro 2013
England got eliminated in the first round.

Euro 2017
England reached the semi final.

Record

*Draws include knockout matches decided by penalty shoot-outs.
**Red border colour denotes tournament was held on home soil.

References

External links
 Official FA England Women website Contains listings of current England Women players.
 Uefa Women's EURO website Contains full results archive
 The Rec.Sport.Soccer Statistics Foundation Contains full record of Championship hosts and additional statistics.

 
Euro
Countries at the UEFA Women's Championship